Nishi-Jūhatchōme Station (西18丁目駅) is a Sapporo Municipal Subway station in Chūō-ku, Sapporo, Hokkaido, Japan. The station number is T07.

Platforms

Surrounding area
Nishi-Jūgo-Chōme Station, Sapporo Streetcar
Sapporo Honganji, (temple)
Migishi Kotaro Museum of Hokkaido, Hokkaido Museum of Modern Art
Sapporo Medical University Hospital, Sapporo Medical University
Hokkaido Cultural Broadcasting
Sapporo district Meteorological Observatory
Sapporo City Public Health Center
Sapporo Medical Association, Night Emergency Medical Center
NTT East Japan Sapporo Hospital
Nakamura Memorial Hospital
Sapporo city Women's Center
Chosei Garden Sapporo Nursing Home
Kita ichijonishi Police Station
Post Office Sapporo Minami ichijonishi
North Pacific Bank Sapporo West, Sapporo Medical University Hospital Office

External links

 Sapporo Subway Stations

Railway stations in Japan opened in 1976
Railway stations in Sapporo
Sapporo Municipal Subway
Chūō-ku, Sapporo